WrestleMania 13 was the 13th annual WrestleMania professional wrestling pay-per-view (PPV) event produced by the World Wrestling Federation (WWF, now WWE). The event was presented by PlayStation and held on March 23, 1997, at the Rosemont Horizon in the Chicago suburb of Rosemont, Illinois. Eight matches were held at the event, including one on the Free for All pre-show.

The main event was a no disqualification match between The Undertaker and Sycho Sid for the WWF Championship, which Undertaker won following interference from Bret Hart. The main matches on the undercard were Bret Hart versus Stone Cold Steve Austin in a No Disqualification Submission match, Legion of Doom and Ahmed Johnson versus Nation of Domination in a Chicago Street Fight, and Rocky Maivia versus The Sultan for the WWF Intercontinental Championship.

WrestleMania 13 was the second WrestleMania to take place in the Chicago metropolitan area, following WrestleMania 2. The event was attended by 18,197 who paid a total of $837,150 in admission fees, and drew a 0.77 buy rate. The event as a whole received mixed to negative reviews. However, the submission match between Bret Hart and Stone Cold Steve Austin was highly praised, being called one of the greatest matches in wrestling history, and has been cited by some as the beginning of the Attitude Era.

Production

Background
WrestleMania is considered the World Wrestling Federation's (WWF, now WWE) flagship pay-per-view (PPV) event, having first been held in 1985. It has become the longest-running professional wrestling event in history and is held annually between mid-March to mid-April. It was the first of the WWF's original four pay-per-views, which includes Royal Rumble, SummerSlam, and Survivor Series, which were dubbed the "Big Four", and was considered one of the "Big Five" PPVs, along with King of the Ring. WrestleMania 13 was scheduled to be held on March 23, 1997, at the Rosemont Horizon in the Chicago suburb of Rosemont, Illinois. The event was presented by PlayStation.

Storylines
The main feud heading into WrestleMania 13 was between The Undertaker and Sycho Sid, with the two battling over the WWF Championship. At In Your House 13, Bret Hart last eliminated The Undertaker in the Final Four match to win the vacant WWF Championship. Hart's reign, however, lasted only one day as he lost the title the next night on Monday Night Raw to Sycho Sid after interference by Stone Cold Steve Austin, one of the other participants in the Final Four match (the other was Vader, who had no further involvement in the ongoing storyline). Due to being the runner-up to the title at Final Four, Undertaker was made the number one contender and was booked to challenge Sycho Sid for the title at WrestleMania. However, on the March 17 edition of Raw Is War, Sid defended the title against Hart in a steel cage match, with the winner defending his title at WrestleMania. During the match, both Undertaker and Austin interfered. Undertaker came out to help Sid because he wanted to wrestle Sid for the title while Austin helped Hart because he wanted to make his scheduled submission match with Hart a title match. Sid won the match and retained his title and as a result, Sid vs. Undertaker remained the main event of WrestleMania.

The second main match on the card was Bret Hart versus Stone Cold Steve Austin in a Submission match. Hart and Austin's rivalry began after Austin won the 1996 King of the Ring tournament and began taunting Hart, who was inactive at the time. Austin insulted Hart in his speeches so Hart would accept his challenge to a match. Hart returned in October and accepted Austin's challenge, with the two facing each other at Survivor Series 1996 where Hart defeated Austin. Their rivalry continued as Hart and Austin were the final two participants in the 1997 Royal Rumble match. Hart had originally eliminated Austin from the match but Austin's elimination was considered unofficial because the officials did not see it as they were busy attending to a brawl between eliminated wrestlers Mankind and Terry Funk. They were participants in a Four Corners Elimination match for the vacant WWF Championship at Final Four, which Hart won. The next night on Monday Night Raw, Austin cost Hart the WWF Championship against Sycho Sid when Hart had applied the Sharpshooter on Sid, Austin nailed Hart with a steel chair followed by Sid powerbombing Hart for the win. Hart and Austin were booked to wrestle in a submission match at WrestleMania, but Hart got a shot at the WWF Championship in a steel cage match on the March 17 edition of Raw Is War, with the winner defending the title against The Undertaker at WrestleMania 13. Hart almost had the match won, until Undertaker interfered and helped Sid in getting the victory.

One of the main undercard matches was a Chicago Street Fight featuring Ahmed Johnson and Legion of Doom (Hawk and Animal) against Nation of Domination (Faarooq, Crush and Savio Vega). Johnson was attacked by a newcomer Faarooq Asad, a Roman gladiator on the July 22, 1996 edition of Monday Night Raw during a match for the WWF Tag Team Championship. Ahmed was scheduled to defend his Intercontinental Championship against Faarooq at SummerSlam 1996 but Ahmed had legitimate kidney problems which forced him to vacate the Intercontinental Championship. In the storyline, Faarooq had caused Ahmed's kidney problem. He returned from his injury in early 1997 and continued with Faarooq, who had formed The Nation of Domination during Ahmed's injury. Ahmed joined forces with the "gang fighters" Legion of Doom and LOD were scheduled to wrestle NOD in a Chicago Street Fight at WrestleMania 13.

Event
Before the event aired live on pay-per-view (PPV), Billy Gunn faced Flash Funk at Free for All. Gunn defeated Funk by pinning him following a tornado DDT.

The first match that aired on television was a Four-Way Tag Team Elimination Match. The match featured The Headbangers (Mosh and Thrasher), The Godwinns (Henry O. Godwinn and Phineas I. Godwinn), The New Blackjacks (Blackjack Windham and Blackjack Bradshaw) and the team of Doug Furnas and Phil LaFon. All the teams wrestled each other and sometimes in the match, teammates also fought against each other. Barry Windham and Phil LaFon brawled to the outside the ring. Bradshaw attacked the referee and got disqualified, which led to the first elimination of the match while Furnas was counted-out. Headbangers and Godwinns were the remaining teams and they battled for five minutes and 39 seconds before Thrasher hit Phineas a Cannonball Senton and won the match via pinfall. As a result of winning the match, Headbangers earned a shot at the WWF Tag Team Championship.

The second match was between Rocky Maivia and The Sultan for Maivia's WWF Intercontinental Championship. The Honky Tonk Man provided commentary for the match. Sultan had an early advantage in the match due to his size and power but Maivia used his quicker moves to push the big man outside the ring. Sultan overpowered Maivia with slams and punches but was unable to pin him. Maivia gained advantage on Sultan by nailing him with a belly to belly suplex, Maivia Hurricane and a flying crossbody before pinning Sultan with a roll-up to win the match and retain the title. After the match, Sultan and his managers, Bob Backlund and The Iron Sheik attacked Maivia before his father, Rocky Johnson, came out to help his son.

The third match was between Hunter Hearst Helmsley and Goldust. Goldust dominated the early portion of the match. Helmsley had brief flurries of offense but Goldust had still the advantage. Helmsley began using submission maneuvers to keep the advantages for himself. Goldust was going to hit his maneuver until Helmsley's bodyguard Chyna manhandled Goldust's wife Marlena to distract him. Helmsley took advantage and hit Goldust with a Pedigree, enabling him to pin Goldust for the win.

The fourth match was a tag team match for the WWF Tag Team Championship, as Owen Hart and The British Bulldog defended the titles against Mankind and Vader. The big Vader made easy work of Owen in the beginning of the match. Vader tagged in with Mankind while Owen tagged in with Bulldog. Bulldog and Mankind punched each other but Bulldog had more advantage. He applied a sleeper hold on Mankind which caused both of them to fall to the outside. They continued to brawl outside. The referee was distracted due to the brawl. Vader took advantage and hit Bulldog with Paul Bearer's urn and dragged him into the ring. Vader and Mankind both took turns and continued to attack Bulldog. Owen tried to save his partner, but Vader used his strength while Mankind used his cheating tactics to overwhelm Owen. Mankind trapped Bulldog to the outside and applied the mandible claw on him. Both men were counted out as the match resulted in a draw. As a result, Hart and Bulldog retained the championship.

The fifth match was a No Disqualification Submission match between Bret Hart and Stone Cold Steve Austin. UFC fighter Ken Shamrock was the special guest referee for this match. Austin attacked Hart, who was still in his entrance attire. The two first beat each other in the ring before the action spilled outside the ring. Hart tossed Austin into the steel ring post while Austin drove him onto the steel barrier. The two men began fighting in the crowd, where both men hit each other with several foreign objects. They moved up the steps high into the crowd. Shamrock followed them and brought them back towards the ring where Austin attempted to use steel steps on Hart, but Hart stopped him with a kick to the midsection. As the action began in the ring, Hart focused on Austin's leg. He busted Austin open with an Irish whip into the steel barricade and Austin's head began to bleed profusely. Hart tried to use a steel chair on Austin's leg, but Austin choked Hart with a television cable. Hart hit Austin in the head with the ring bell. He applied a Sharpshooter on Austin who did not submit and tried to resist but passed out from the pain and loss of blood. Shamrock awarded the match to Hart, but Hart continued to attack Austin which led to a double-turn as the fans turned on Hart and began cheering for Austin. Shamrock pulled Hart off of Austin and executed a waistlock takedown and physically challenged him to a fight. Hart declined to fight Shamrock and left the ring to a chorus of boos. Austin, meanwhile, after regaining consciousness, hit a Stunner on a referee when he tried to help Austin out, then slowly limped away to backstage, while the crowd chanted his name.

The sixth match of the event was a Chicago Street Fight between the Legion of Doom (Hawk and Animal) and Ahmed Johnson and Nation of Domination (Faarooq, Crush and Savio Vega). All the two teams hit each other with many foreign objects. The match continued inside the ring and outside the ring in the same fashion. Finally, Animal hit Crush with a 2x4 and then pinned him to win the match.

Main Event

The main event was a No Disqualification Match between The Undertaker and reigning champion Sycho Sid for the WWF Championship. Shawn Michaels provided commentary for the match. The then-heel superstar, Bret Hart, came out during the match and insulted Undertaker, Michaels and particularly Sid because he claimed that Sid had screwed him out of the title. Sid powerbombed Hart while Undertaker took advantage and began attacking the champion from behind. Undertaker went for an Old School but Sid took him in a bearhug. Sid attacked Undertaker with various moves and attacked him with television monitors, and applied a camel clutch on Undertaker. Sid had the advantage in the match until Hart came back and attacked Sid with a steel chair. He recovered and got Undertaker in the powerbomb but Hart returned again and distracted Sid which allowed Undertaker to hit Sid with the Tombstone and pin him to win the match.

Reception
The event was attended by 18,197 who paid a total of $837,150 in admission fees and drew a 0.77 buy-rate.

In 2011, Marc Elusive of 411mania gave the event an overall score of 7.0 out of 10.0 and noted that "The Attitude Era began here..." and that the main event was "a very boring match". John Canton of The John Report gave the event an overall score of 4 out of 10 and said that the show was "poor" and noted that the main event "sucked for the first 15 minutes, but the ending was okay".

Despite the lackluster reviews towards the event, the submission match between Hart and Austin was highly praised. In 2007, it was placed #1 on IGN's list of Top 20 Matches in WrestleMania History, and described as a match that "launched an era." Thomas Golianopoulos of Complex Sports also ranked it at number 1 in his list of the 50 Greatest Matches in WrestleMania History, citing the match's six factors of storyline, innovation, psychology, finish, post-match angle, and fallout. Elusive of 411mania described the match as "outstanding" and "that helped propel Steve Austin into the stratosphere and become the star of the late 90s and the early 00s", while also noting the double-turn after the match. John Canton called the match a "wrestling perfection". It received a five-star rating from Dave Meltzer and was also voted Match of the Year (1997) by readers of his Wrestling Observer Newsletter publication. Pro Wrestling Illustrated readers named it Match of the Year (1997).

Aftermath
Stone Cold Steve Austin and Bret Hart continued their rivalry after WrestleMania, but Austin was now a babyface and his popularity would start to increase considerably while Hart was a heel. Hart recruited British Bulldog, Owen Hart, Brian Pillman and former tag team partner Jim Neidhart to reform The Hart Foundation. At Revenge of the 'Taker, Hart and Austin had a match which Austin won by disqualification. Their feud continued until Canadian Stampede, where the Hart Foundation (working as faces in Canada) defeated the American team of Austin, Ken Shamrock, Legion of Doom (Hawk and Animal) and Goldust.

The Undertaker received a push after he won his second WWF Championship at WrestleMania 13. He spent a reign of 133 days which included battles with Mankind, Steve Austin, Faarooq and Vader. At SummerSlam 1997, Undertaker's long reign finally ended when he lost the title to Bret Hart when special guest referee Shawn Michaels accidentally struck Undertaker with a steel chair, which was intended for Hart.

After losing the WWF Championship to The Undertaker at WrestleMania, Sycho Sid's push began to diminish and after King of the Ring he began to disappear from WWF programming. In actuality, Sid quietly left WWF to focus on recovering from a neck injury. Sid eventually returned to rival promotion World Championship Wrestling (WCW) in 1999 and continued to wrestle as Sid Vicious until he suffered a near career-ending leg injury at WCW Sin on January 14 2001.

Results

Other on-screen personnel

References

External links
 The Official Website of WrestleMania 13

WrestleMania
Professional wrestling in the Chicago metropolitan area
1997 in Illinois
Events in Rosemont, Illinois
1997 WWF pay-per-view events
March 1997 events in the United States